"Of Late I Think of Cliffordville" is episode 116 of the American television anthology series The Twilight Zone. It originally aired on April 11, 1963, on CBS. In this episode, an elderly business tycoon buys the opportunity to enjoy amassing his fortune a second time.

Opening narration

Plot
William J. Feathersmith, the 75-year-old president of a large corporation, is a sadistic man who has made his fortune by financially preying on others. One night, a drunken Feathersmith confesses to the janitor, Mr. Hecate, that having reached the height of success, he is left feeling empty and purposeless, and dreams of returning to his small hometown of Cliffordville, Indiana, to start life anew. Hecate says that Cliffordville happens to be his hometown, as well.

Attempting to go home for the night, Feathersmith is instead taken by the elevator to the 13th floor, where he finds a travel agency that was not there the day before. The agency's head, "Miss Devlin", is revealed to be the Devil, as two horns in her head become increasingly prominent. Devlin offers to fulfill his wish to return to 1910 Cliffordville, agreeing to his terms that he will look the same as he did then, but retain all memories of his first life, in exchange for almost all his liquidated worth, leaving him with $1,412. As he knows which investments have succeeded and which have failed in the last 50 years, Feathersmith agrees.

Back in 1910 Cliffordville, he uses $1,403 to buy 1,403 acres of land which he knows to contain deposits of oil. He forgets, however, that the drill needed to access oil so far beneath the ground will not be invented until 1937. Feathersmith tries to woo the daughter of a bank owner, but is startled that rather than being the charming girl he remembers, she is plain, plays the piano poorly, chatters incessantly, and insists on entertaining guests with her shrill singing. Many of the stocks in which he invests drop in value. He tries to "invent" devices such as a self-starter for automobiles, but does not know how to design them. The townspeople ridicule this, which causes Feathersmith to suffer palpitations. He realizes that following the strict letter of his terms, Devlin has made him appear 30, but he is still biologically 75. Devlin appears. Feathersmith accuses her of altering the past, but she says that all is as it was; he just chose to remember it differently. She needles him that he has lived off the work of others and is unable to create anything himself.

He pleads with Devlin to send him back to 1963, even after she warns him that his actions in 1910 have changed things, and it can no longer be the 1963 he knew. She agrees to fulfill his wish for just $40. Having no money left, Feathersmith hastily sells the deed to his land to Hecate for the $40, and leaves 1910 Cliffordville in disgrace.

In an altered 1963, Hecate is now the president of the corporation, having founded it with his oil profits earned after 1937. A cold and extremely self-centered man, Hecate mocks Feathersmith for having been a janitor for 44 years, while the now-powerless Feathersmith can only stand there and take the ridicule, just as Hecate had once did in his place.

Closing narration

Production
In the scene in which Feathersmith negotiates his way out of Cliffordville, several crates in the alley are marked "This End Up", which were used as shipping crates for the wax figures in the previous episode, "The New Exhibit".

In a published version of Twilight Zone stories, "Blind ally", this story is somewhat different--it takes place during world War II, although Feathersmith is still a self centered sadistic bore--but is also a very sick elderly man . He makes a deal with the Devil to go back in 1910  to his hometown of Cliffordsville, Texas (instead of Indiana). Like in the show, he fails to make any fortune as he realizes too late that the equipment for drilling deep oil hasn't been invented yet. He forgets to ask for the restoration of his health and youth and dies after a  week in the past.

Cast
Albert Salmi as William Feathersmith
Julie Newmar as Miss Devlin
John Anderson as Dietrich
Wright King as Mr. Hecate
Guy Raymond as Gibbons
John Harmon as Clark
Hugh Sanders as Cronk

References
DeVoe, Bill. (2008). Trivia from The Twilight Zone. Albany, GA: Bear Manor Media. 
Grams, Martin. (2008). The Twilight Zone: Unlocking the Door to a Television Classic. Churchville, MD: OTR Publishing.

External links

1963 American television episodes
The Twilight Zone (1959 TV series season 4) episodes
Works based on the Faust legend
Television episodes about time travel
Television episodes written by Rod Serling
Fiction set in 1910
Fiction set in 1963
Television shows based on short fiction
Television episodes set in Indiana
Fiction about the Devil